Cupid Untying the Zone of Venus (originally entitled A Nymph and Cupid: 'The Snake in the Grass' or The Snake in the Grass, or Love unloosing the zone of Beauty; later also known as Love and Beauty and Cupid Untying the Girdle of Venus) is a painting by Joshua Reynolds. It shows Cupid untying the girdle of his mother Venus – the latter was modelled on Emma Hart.

Provenance 
The earliest version was that exhibited in 1784 and bought by the Tate Gallery in 1871. A 1785 autograph copy made for Reynolds' niece the Marchioness of Thomond was bought at the sale of her collection in May 1821 by Sir John Soane – it is thus now in the Soane Museum. In 1788, Lord Carysfort commissioned an autograph copy to present to Prince Grigory Potemkin, which is now in the Hermitage Museum in Saint Petersburg.

References 

Nude art
Paintings by Joshua Reynolds
1788 paintings
Paintings in the collection of the Hermitage Museum
Collection of the Tate galleries
Collection of Sir John Soane's Museum
Paintings of Cupid
Paintings of Venus